Caitlin Beevers (born 11 October 2001) is a professional rugby league footballer and referee.

Playing career
Beevers was a pupil at St John Fisher Catholic Voluntary Academy in Dewsbury and was a member of the school's team that won the Year 11 Nation Schools in 2017.  In the final Beevers scored 38 points (5 tries and 9 goals) in a 66–0 victory over Shotton Hall of Peterlee.  At club level Beevers started her playing career at Birstall Victoria ARLFC as a 7 year old. She later played for Dewsbury Moor and was named "player of the match" after the 2018 Women's Rugby League Association Challenge Cup Final on 1 April 2018 despite being on the losing side as Dewsbury Moor lost 12–15 to Wigan St Patricks.

Having been recruited by Leeds Rhinos Women for their under-19 academy in January 2018,  Beevers was subsequently promoted to the first team for the 2018 Women's Super League season.

Beevers was a member of the Leeds Rhinos team that won the 2018 Women's Challenge Cup final and scored a try in the 20–14 win over Castleford Tigers Women.

While at Dewsbury Moor, Beevers played her first representative match when she played for Yorkshire in the Women’s Rugby League Association County of Origin game against Lancashire on 28 January 2018.

Beevers made her international debut for England against France in Carcasonne on 27 October 2018, scoring two tries in England's 54–4 win.

Refereeing career
Beevers started refereeing aged 13 and is a member of Dewsbury & Batley Referees Society.  In 2018 she became the first woman to referee a rugby league game at Wembley Stadium when she refereed the Year 7 Boys National Schools Final (the curtain raiser to the Challenge Cup Final).

References

2001 births
Living people
English female rugby league players
England women's national rugby league team players
English women referees and umpires
Rugby league players from Dewsbury
Leeds Rhinos Women players
Rugby league fullbacks
Rugby league wingers